Marianne Kehlau (1925–2002) was a German actress.

Selected filmography
  (1974)
 Assassination in Davos (1975)
 Tadellöser & Wolff (1975)
 Sonderdezernat K1 (1972)
 Tatort (1970)

References

External links

1925 births
2002 deaths
Actresses from Hamburg
German film actresses
20th-century German actresses